Nationality words link to articles with information on the nation's poetry or literature (for instance, Irish or France).

Events
 Godey's Lady's Book, the most popular women's magazine of the 19th century in the United States, is founded in Philadelphia by Louise Antoine Godey. Its circulation would reach 150,000. The magazine contained recipes, articles on beauty and health, sentimental and didactic writing and book reviews as well as the work of Ralph Waldo Emerson, Henry Wadsworth Longfellow, Oliver Wendell Holmes, Edgar Allan Poe and Harriet Beecher Stowe. The magazine lasted until 1898
 In Germany, a loose group of writers known as Young Germany (Junges Deutschland) begins to flourish this year. The movement continues until 1850
 La bibliothèque canadienne, a French Canadian magazine edited by Michel Bibaud, ceases publication this year (it began in 1825)

Works

United Kingdom
 Thomas Aird, The Captive of Fez
 Lord Byron, Letters and Journals of Lord Byron, edited by Thomas Moore, biographical
 Samuel Taylor Coleridge and Robert Southey, anonymously published, The Devil's Walk; original version published in the Morning Post, September 6, 1799 as "The Devil's Thoughts"
 George Croly, Poetical Works
 Ebenezer Elliott, Corn Law Rhymes: The Ranter
 Caroline Fry, anonymously published, The Listener, poetry and prose
 John Abraham Heraud, anonymously published, The Descent into Hell
 Richard Lower, Tom Cladpole's Jurney to Lunnon, told by himself, and written in pure Sussex doggerel by his Uncle Tim, sells at least twenty thousand copies
 Robert Montgomery, Satan
 Caroline Norton
 The Undying One and Other Poems
The Faithless Knight
 Alfred Tennyson, Poems, Chiefly Lyrical, including "The Kraken" and "Mariana" (see also Poems 1842)
 Charles Tennyson (later Charles Tennyson Turner), Sonnets and Fugitive Pieces

United States
 Sarah Josepha Hale, Poems for Our Children, written at Lowell Mason's request; includes "Mary's Lamb", with the verse "Mary Had a Little Lamb"; this poem and some others would be reprinted in McGuffy Readers and in various anthologies many times, without credit given to the author
 George Pope Morris, "Woodman, Spare That Tree!", a popular poem praised by Edgar Allan Poe, who described it as a work "of which any poet, living or dead, might justly be proud"; first published in the New York Mirror and later included in The Deserted Bride and Other Poems in 1838; frequently published in schoolbooks and reprinted in support of conservation efforts
 William Gilmore Simms, Tricolor, or Three Days of Blood in Paris

Other in English
 Kasiprasad Ghose, Shair and Other Poems, the first volume of poetry by an Indian in English
 Adam Kidd, The Huron Chief, and Other Poems, Montreal: "Printed at the Office of the Herald and New Gazette", Canada

Works published in other languages

French language

French Canada
 Michel Bibaud, Épitres, satires, chansons, épigrammes et autres pièces de vers; French language; Montreal: Ludger Duvernay, a l'Imprimerie de Minerve, the first book of French poetry published in Canada

France
 Théophile Gautier, Poésies, 42 poems in a wide variety of verse forms, often imitating other, more established Romantic poets such as Sainte-Beuve, Alphonse de Lamartine, and Victor Hugo; composed when the author was 18 years old; since publication took place during the July Revolution, no copies were sold and it was eventually withdrawn (reissued in 1832 with 20 additional poems under the name Albertus; revised edition, 1845)
 Alphonse de Lamartine, Harmonies poétiques et religieuses
 Alfred de Musset, Comtes d'Espagne et d'Italie
 Charles-Augustin Sainte-Beuve, Les Consolations

Births
Death years link to the corresponding "[year] in poetry" article:
 January 1 - Paul Hamilton Hayne (died 1886) Southern American poet, critic, and editor
 January 11 - Cornelia J. M. Jordan (died 1898) American poet and lyricist
 May 5 - Thomas Edward Brown (died 1897), Manx poet, scholar and theologian
 September 8 - Frédéric Mistral, French poet who led the 19th century revival of Occitan (Provençal) language and literature, a key figure in the literary félibrige movement, and one of two winners of the 1904 Nobel Prize in Literature for his contributions in literature and philology.
 October 18 - Helen Hunt Jackson (died 1885) American poet and writer
 December 5 - Christina Rossetti (died 1894) English poet
 December 10 - Emily Dickinson, American poet (died 1886)
 December 23 - Charlotte Alington Barnard (died 1869) English poet and composer of ballads and hymns
 Undated - James M. Whitfield, American

Deaths
Death years link to the corresponding "[year] in poetry" article:
 January 17 – Wilhelm Waiblinger (born 1804), German Romantic poet
 August 20 – Vasily Pushkin (born 1766), Russian poet
 September 18 – William Hazlitt (born 1778), English writer, essayist and critic
 September 23 – A. Flowerdew (born 1759), English poet and hymnist

See also

 Poetry
 List of years in poetry
 List of years in literature
 19th century in poetry
 19th century in literature
 Golden Age of Russian Poetry (1800–1850)
 Weimar Classicism period in Germany, commonly considered to have begun in 1788  and to have ended either in 1805, with the death of Friedrich Schiller, or 1832, with the death of Goethe
 Lists of poets

Notes

Poetry
19th-century poetry